Aminet is the world's largest archive of Amiga-related software and files. Aminet was originally hosted by several universities' FTP sites, and is now available on CD-ROM and on the web. According to Aminet, as of 3 September 2022, it has 83930 packages online.

History
In January 1992, Swiss student Urban Müller took over a software archive that had been started by other members of a computer science students' club. Soon the archive became mirrored worldwide and in 1995 started being distributed on monthly CD-ROMs. By using a single master site (then wuarchive.wustl.edu) for creating ftp scripts for each slave site, Aminet reduced to a bare minimum the effort to set up new mirror sites. Aminet also illustrates practical use of metadata schema by software repositories. Reports of daily additions to this software archive were posted automatically to Usenet (de.comp.sys.amiga.archive), or could be requested as an email newsletter. Most of the programs on Aminet were public domain or shareware, but software companies made updates and demo versions of their programs available as well. Now Aminet is complemented by platform specific sites archiving software for AmigaOS 4, AROS or MorphOS only.

Aminet was an early attempt to create a centralized public archive maintained by the users themselves, predated only by the Info-Mac archive. Aminet aimed to keep the community united and free to download new open source software, new program demo releases, patches and localization of Amiga programs (AmigaOS and its modern programs are free to be localized by any single user into any country language), pictures, audio and video files and even hints or complete solutions to various Amiga games.

Recognized among interesting FTP sites in early 1990s, Aminet was the largest public archive of software for any platform until around 1996. When the Internet explosion occurred from 1996 to 1999, Aminet rapidly fell behind the emerging massive PC archives.

During 2004 the main Aminet mirror suffered from a hard-disk crash and many people considered the whole project dead. Around the same time, Nicolas Mendoza was setting up a modernized interface that indexed Aminet and provided advanced search features and a modern interface to navigate the tree, called Amirepo. He also posted public suggestions on how to help improving Aminet by adding tags for architectures to help catalog the tree that now consisted of MorphOS, AmigaOS 4 and Amithlon files, in addition to the already existing m68k, PowerUP and WarpOS files. He also suggested on measures to add proper dependencies to complement and replace the existing Requires field. This also in a future goal of letting Aminet function as a repository for package management systems similar to Debian's APT/DPKG and Red Hats' RPM. He tried to contact individuals like Matthias Scheler and Urban Müller which was known to maintain Aminet, but to no avail.

At the end of 2004 Christoph Gutjahr made contact with Urban Müller and set up a team to continue the Aminet effort. Urban Müller provided a new main mirror site and the backlog of packages were added in. The Amirepo interface of Nicolas Mendoza was integrated and Aminet was officially up and running again in February 2005. During 2005 the uploads started getting going again and in November 2005 most of the ambiguous files and .readme files were sorted out, finally sanitizing the repository. The team has gradually made many changes.

References

External links
Aminet
Aminet Wiki
The AROS Archives
MorphOS files, MorphOS Storage
OS4Depot

Amiga
File hosting
Software distribution platforms